The Witts Springs Formation is a sandstone geologic formation in Arkansas with thin layers of limestone, shale, and siltstone. It preserves fossils dating back to the Carboniferous period.

Paleontology

Bivalves
Aviculopecten
A. arkansanus
Conocardium
Myalina
Pleurophorus
Posidonia
Sphenotus

Brachiopods
Antiquatonia
A. morrowensis
Composita
C. ozarkana
Juresania
Linoproductus
Schizophoria
S. altirostris
Spirifer

Cephalopods
Gastrioceras
G. adaense
Glaphyrites
G. globosus
G. morrowensis
G. oblatus
Mooreoceras
Pygmaeoceras
Stenopronorites
S. arkansiensis

Coral
Michelinia

Gastropods
Bellerophon
Donaldina
Euphemites
Glabrocingulum
Knightites (Retispira or Cymatospire)

Scaphopods
Laevidentalium

Trilobites
Paladin

See also

 List of fossiliferous stratigraphic units in Arkansas
 Paleontology in Arkansas

References

 

Carboniferous Arkansas
Carboniferous southern paleotropical deposits